The 1961 Denver Broncos season was the team's second year in the American Football League. Led by head coach Frank Filchock, the Broncos recorded three wins and eleven losses, finishing third in the AFL's Western Division.

The 1961 Broncos set a modern pro football record with 68 giveaways, more than any other team in AFL or NFL history.

Offseason

Draft

Staff

Regular season

Standings

External links
 1961 Denver Broncos Statistics & Players – Pro-Football-Reference.com

Denver Broncos seasons
Denver Broncos
1961 in sports in Colorado